Bettle Peak is a peak,  high, standing west of Bowers Piedmont Glacier and  north of the Granite Knolls in Victoria Land. It was named by the Advisory Committee on Antarctic Names for James F. Bettle, a United States Antarctic Research Program meteorologist and scientific leader at McMurdo Station in 1962.

References 

Mountains of Victoria Land
Scott Coast